Miandasteh (also Romanized as Mīāndasteh; also known as Mīān Dasteh-ye Jalāl Arzak) is a village in Karipey Rural District, Lalehabad District, Babol County, Mazandaran Province, Iran. At the 2006 census, its population was 600, in 145 families.

References 

Populated places in Babol County